The following lists events that happened during 2022 in Niue.

Incumbents 

 Monarch: Elizabeth II (until 8 September); Charles III onwards

 Premier – Dalton Tagelagi
 Speaker of the Assembly – Hima Douglas

Events 
Ongoing – COVID-19 pandemic in Oceania

 16 January – 2022 Hunga Tonga–Hunga Ha'apai eruption and tsunami: Coastal areas are evacuated following the eruption of Hunga Tonga–Hunga Haʻapai, no tsunami is reported.
 10 March – Niue reports its first COVID-19 case since the pandemic began in a person who traveled from New Zealand and who had tested negative prior to departing.
 6 July – The New Zealand Defence Force says that, upon request by the government of Niue, it is sending a team of civilian doctors, nurses, and defense personnel to help the territory deal with an outbreak of COVID-19.
 8 September – Elizabeth II dies at Balmoral Castle, Scotland, her son and heir Charles III becomes King of Niue.
 19 September  – Premier Dalton Tagelagi attends the funeral of Elizabeth II.

Sports 

 28 July – 8 August: Niue at the 2022 Commonwealth Games

References 

 
2020s in Niue
Years of the 21st century in Niue
Niue